Bruce W. Wasem is a former American football and baseball coach.  He served as head football coach at the University of Virginia's College at Wise   for eight seasons, from 2002 until 2010, compiling a record of 48–52.  He helped start the program in 1991.  For the 2006 season, he was awarded conference coach of the year and the team was given the NAIA Champions of Character award.  He previously was the head baseball coach and assistant football coach for Wilmington College in Wilmington, Ohio.

Head coaching record

Football

References

Year of birth missing (living people)
Living people
Bluffton Beavers football players
Virginia–Wise Cavaliers football coaches
Wilmington Quakers baseball coaches
Wilmington Quakers football coaches